HD 64440, also known as a Puppis, is a spectroscopic binary star in the constellation Puppis. Its apparent magnitude is 3.71. Located around  distant, the primary is a bright giant of spectral type K1.5II and the secondary is an early A-type star. They orbit with a period just under 7 years and eccentricity 0.38.

References

Puppis
K-type bright giants
Spectroscopic binaries
Puppis, a
CD-40 3579
038414
3080
064440